Trisha Silvers (born 19 April 1981 in Melbourne, Victoria) became known in Australia for surviving the tsunami of 26 December 2004, in which her new husband Troy Broadbridge was killed.

Biography
She is active in the Reach Foundation, an Australian organisation that promotes youth self-esteem and is the founder of the Reach Broadbridge Fund which she now manages part-time. In 2005, Silvers wrote Beyond the Wave, which chronicles her life prior to, during and after the tsunami.

She was the 2006 recipient of the Young Australian of the Year Award, for her work in Thailand and with Australian youth.

In 2006, she appeared on the Nine Network's Torvill and Dean's Dancing on Ice and had a brief relationship with Ryan Phelan.

In 2007, she was the official ambassador for Melbourne's Moomba festival.

In 2013, Silvers was appointed Chief Executive Officer of Melbourne's St Kilda Youth Service.

In February 2015, Silvers married fiancé Jake Squires in a wedding ceremony at Brighton beach, Victoria.

In May 2016, Trisha Silvers now known as Trisha Squires moved to Hobart, Tasmania with her husband and in June the same year they opened a cafe at Princes St Sandy Bay, called Nutrient Bar which they sold in September 2017. They have 2 daughters Harper born 2015 and Holly born 2016.

In February 2018, Trisha Squires was appointed Chief Executive Officer of AFL Tasmania.

In November 2020, Trisha Squires was appointed head of AFL Queensland.

References

1981 births
Living people
VFL/AFL administrators